The River and Harbors Act of 1915 is an American law passed by the United States Congress in 1915. It provided federal funds for anchorage grounds to be built in various rivers and harbors around the country.  Many projects were in Maine, Connecticut, New Jersey, and Maryland. The law was one of a series of River and Harbors Acts passed regularly by Congress between 1824 and 1970.

Several sections of the 1915 Act have not been superseded and are still in effect under U.S. Code Title 33, covering navigable waters. These include a provision allowing the Army Corps of Engineers to receive private donations towards river and harbor improvement projects, a section covering the definition of channel depths and dimensions, and Congress' permission for the elimination of Swan Creek in Toledo, Ohio, although this has not been carried out as of 2019.

References 

1915 in law
United States federal admiralty and maritime legislation